The Man with the Golden Arm is a 1955 American drama film with elements of film noir directed by Otto Preminger, based on the novel of the same name by Nelson Algren. Starring Frank Sinatra, Eleanor Parker, Kim Novak, Arnold Stang and Darren McGavin, It recounts the story of a drug addict who gets clean while in prison, but struggles to stay that way in the outside world. Although the addictive drug is never identified in the film, according to the American Film Institute "most contemporary and modern sources assume that it is heroin", although in Algren's book it is morphine. The film's initial release was controversial for its treatment of the then-taboo subject of drug addiction.

It was nominated for three Academy Awards: Sinatra for Best Actor in a Leading Role, Joseph C. Wright and Darrell Silvera for Best Art Direction-Set Decoration, Black-and-White and Elmer Bernstein for Best Music, Scoring of a Dramatic or Comedy Picture. Sinatra was also nominated for best actor awards by the BAFTAs and The New York Film Critics. The film is in the public domain, and in 2020 was added into the National Film Registry.

Plot

Frankie Machine is released from the federal Narcotic Farm in Lexington, Kentucky, with a set of drums and a new outlook on life, and returns to his run-down neighborhood on the North Side of Chicago. A drug addict (the drug is never named, but heroin is strongly implied), Frankie became clean in prison. On the outside, he greets friends and acquaintances. Sparrow, who runs a con selling homeless dogs, clings to him like a young brother, but Schwiefka, whom Frankie used to deal for in his illegal card game, has more sinister reasons for welcoming him back, as does Louie, Machine's former drug dealer.

Frankie returns home to his wife Zosh, who supposedly needs to use a wheelchair after a car crash some years earlier that was caused by Frankie driving drunk. Zosh is secretly fully recovered, but pretends to be unable to walk to keep making Frankie feel guilty so he will stay with her. Frankie comments on the whistle she wears around her neck, a device she used in Frankie's absence to summon a neighbor, Vi, when needed.  With Frankie home, Zosh smothers her husband in their small tenement apartment and hinders his attempt to make something of himself. He thinks he has what it takes to play drums for a big band. While calling to make an appointment, he bumps into an old flame, Molly, who works in a local strip joint as a hostess and lives in the apartment below Frankie's. Unlike Zosh, Molly encourages his dream of becoming a drummer.

Frankie soon gets himself a tryout and asks Sparrow to get him a new suit, but the suit is a stolen one and he ends up back in a cell at a local Chicago police precinct. Schwiefka offers to pay the bail. Frankie refuses, but soon changes his mind when the sight of a drug addict on the edge becomes too much for him. Now, to repay the debt, he must deal cards for Schwiefka again. Louie is trying to hook him on drugs again, and with no job and Zosh to please, pressure is building from all directions.

Soon Frankie succumbs and is back on drugs and dealing marathon all-night card games for Schwiefka. Molly sees he is using drugs again and runs away from him. He gets a tryout as a drummer but spends 24 hours straight dealing a poker game, during which he is discovered cheating and beaten up. Desperately needing a fix, Frankie follows Louie home, attacks him, and ransacks his house, but cannot find his drug stash. At the audition, with withdrawal coming on, Frankie can't keep the beat and ruins his chance of landing the drumming job. When Louie goes to see Zosh to try to find Frankie, Louie discovers that Zosh has been faking her paralysis and can walk. Zosh, scared of being found out, pushes Louie over the railing of the stairwell to his death, but things backfire when Frankie is sought for Louie's murder.

Initially not realizing he is a suspect in Louie's death, Frankie goes to Molly hoping to get money for a fix. After learning that Captain Bednar and the police are looking for him, Molly convinces Frankie that he must go cold turkey if he is to stand a chance with the police. Frankie agrees and is locked in Molly's apartment where he goes through a grueling withdrawal to clear the drugs from his body. Finally clean again, he tells Zosh he is going to leave her, start anew and stand trial. In her desperation to keep Frankie from leaving her, Zosh once again gives herself away, standing up in front of Frankie and the police. She runs, but can get no farther than the outside balcony. Trapped, she blows the whistle and throws herself off the balcony to her death. A police ambulance then arrives to remove Zosh's lifeless body and drives away, while Frankie watches in dismay. He then walks away, with Molly following as Sparrow can be seen walking away in the opposite direction.

Cast

 Frank Sinatra as Frankie "Dealer" Machine
 Eleanor Parker as Sophia "Zosh" Machine
 Kim Novak as Molly Novotny
 Arnold Stang as Sparrow
 Darren McGavin as "Nifty Louie" Fomorowski
 Robert Strauss as Zero Schwiefka
 John Conte as Drunkie John
 Doro Merande as Vi
 George E. Stone as Sam Markette
 George Mathews as Williams
 Leonid Kinskey as Dominowski
 Emile Meyer as Captain Bednar
 Shorty Rogers as himself (bandleader at audition)
 Ralph Peña as himself (bassist at audition)
 Shelly Manne as himself (drummer at audition)

Production
Screen rights to Algren's novel were first acquired in 1949 on behalf of John Garfield, who planned to star in the film version. However, production was delayed because the Production Code Authority (PCA) refused to approve the script, with Joseph Breen stating that the basic story was "unacceptable" because of the Code's prohibition on showing illegal drug trafficking and drug addiction. The ability to obtain PCA approval was critical because at that time, many movie theaters would not show films that had not received approval. The PCA further predicted that the subject would also be unacceptable to the National Legion of Decency (a Catholic film censor board), Federal authorities, and state and local censor boards in the United States and abroad. Garfield died in 1952 and the film rights were acquired by Otto Preminger from his estate.

Preminger had previously released The Moon Is Blue (1953), which succeeded at the box office despite being denied the Production Code seal of approval due to its sexual subject matter. He told Peter Bogdanovich why he was attracted to Algren's novel: "I think there's a great tragedy in any human being who gets hooked on something, whether it's heroin or love or a woman or whatever." Although United Artists (UA) had a distribution contract with Preminger, a clause in the contract allowed them to withdraw if a film failed to get Code approval. Preminger stated that in that event, he would set up his own company to handle distribution of The Man with the Golden Arm. Preminger continued to have problems with the PCA during the making of the film.

Although the novel's author, Nelson Algren, was initially brought to Hollywood to work on the screenplay, he and Preminger were incompatible from the start and the situation did not improve. Algren was quickly replaced by Walter Newman. Preminger and Newman made significant changes to Algren's original story,

Frank Sinatra jumped at a chance to star in the film before reading the entire script. The script was given to Marlon Brando around the same time as Sinatra, who still harbored some anger at Brando for beating out Sinatra for the lead role in On the Waterfront. To prepare for his role, Sinatra spent time at drug rehabilitation clinics observing addicts going cold turkey. He also learned to play drums from drummer Shelly Manne. The picture was shot in six weeks at RKO Studios in Hollywood from September 26 through November 4, 1955.

Saul Bass designed the crooked arm symbol used in the film's advertising campaign, which Preminger liked so much that he threatened to pull the picture if an exhibitor changed the advertisements. Bass also created the animated title sequence for the film, the first of many such sequences that he created for films by Preminger, Alfred Hitchcock, and others.

Controversy over release
Preminger decided to release the finished film prior to submitting it for a Code seal of approval. He contended that his film would not entice any viewers to take drugs, since drug use was depicted as having severely negative consequences.  United Artists, which had invested $1 million in the film's production, opted to distribute the film, even though doing so could result in the company being fined $25,000 by the Motion Picture Association of America (MPAA). The president of United Artists, Arthur Krim, expressed the company's hope that the PCA would make an exception to its usual rules and grant the film approval because of the film's "immense potential for public service." The film received several advance bookings in November and early December 1955, before the PCA had made a decision on whether to grant a Code seal.

However, in early December 1955, the PCA denied the film a Code seal, and the decision was upheld upon appeal to the MPAA. As a result, United Artists resigned from the MPAA that same month (although the company re-joined a few years later). The National Legion of Decency also showed disagreement with the PCA ruling by rating the film as a "B" meaning "morally objectionable in part for all", instead of a "C" meaning "condemned", which was the rating normally given to films that were denied a Code seal. Large theater circuits including Loews also refused to ban the film and instead showed it despite the lack of a Code seal. As a result of the controversy, the MPAA investigated and revised production codes, allowing later movies more freedom to deeply explore hitherto taboo subjects such as drug abuse, kidnapping, miscegenation, abortion, and prostitution.

In the end, The Man with the Golden Arm finally received the Production Code seal number 20011 in June 1961, which permitted the film to be reissued and sold for television broadcast.

Reception

The Man with the Golden Arm earned $4,100,000 at the North American box office and the critical reception was just as strong; Variety magazine stated: "Otto Preminger's The Man with the Golden Arm is a feature that focuses on addiction to narcotics. Clinical in its probing of the agonies, this is a gripping, fascinating film, expertly produced and directed and performed with marked conviction by Frank Sinatra as the drug slave."

On Rotten Tomatoes, the film holds an approval rating of 81% from 58 reviews.

Differences from the novel

After replacing novel author and original screenwriter Nelson Algren with Walter Newman, Preminger proceeded to change the plot and characters extensively from the original novel, which led to feelings of bitterness from Algren. When photographer and friend Art Shay asked Algren to pose below the film's marquee, he is reported to have said, "What does that movie have to do with me?"

Even though the first draft of the novel did not even deal with drug addiction (it was only added later), this became the singular focus of the film. In the novel, Frankie served in World War II and became addicted to morphine following treatment for a war injury. There is little mention of Frankie's film counterpart serving in the war, and he tells Molly that he started drugs "for kicks."

In Algren's novel, Frankie is a blond-haired man in his late 20s, and as a poor veteran he often wears a torn Army jacket and brogans. Played by Sinatra (who was nearly 40 years old at the time), the film's protagonist has dark hair and normally wears slacks and a dress shirt. In the film he is given a drum set and almost lands a job as a big band drummer, but in the novel he only has a practice pad, and his dream of being a drummer is only a fleeting aspiration.

The novel implies that Zosh's paralysis is a psychosomatic symptom of her mental illness, but in the film she is deliberately deceiving Frankie and is fully able to walk.

The novel's version of Violet ("Vi") is an attractive young woman and Sparrow's love interest. In the film, she is played by Doro Merande, who was in her 60s at the time. The movie combines the character of her spouse, "Old Husband" Koskozka, with that of the landlord, "Jailer" Schwabatski.

Frankie's employer, Schwiefka, is a relatively neutral character in the novel, but in the film he is a villain and Nifty Louie's partner.

In the novel, Frankie inadvertently kills Nifty Louie during a fight, while in the film, a walking Zosh pushes Louie to his death.

Algren's novel ends with a cornered and hopeless Frankie committing suicide, but in the film Zosh is the one who dies, while Sinatra's Frankie and Novak's Molly survive the end of the film together.

In April 1956, Preminger and others were sued by Algren, who was seeking an injunction to keep him from claiming ownership of the property as "An Otto Preminger Film". Algren's suit said the original agreement in 1949 for the film rights had promised him a percentage of the gross for the screen rights. However, he had to drop the suit because he could not afford the legal fees.

Preservation
The Academy Film Archive preserved The Man with the Golden Arm in 2005. In 2020, the film was selected for preservation in the National Film Registry by the Library of Congress as being "culturally, historically, or aesthetically significant".

Musical score and soundtrack

The film score was composed, arranged and conducted by Elmer Bernstein, and the soundtrack album was released on the Decca label in February 1956. Allmusic's Bradley Torreano called it "one of the finest jazz soundtracks to come out of the '50s" and said that "on its own it still shines as an excellent example of how good film music can get. Bernstein's control over the smallest details of the music is what gives it the energy it contains; his blustery horns and deep percussion are only the front while some gorgeous orchestration happens almost unnoticed behind the music."

The title theme was recorded by many other musicians including Billy May & His Orchestra who had a #9 hit in the UK in May 1956; Jet Harris, who released it as a single in 1963, Glam rockers Sweet covered the theme on their album Desolation Boulevard (Europe LP only), and Barry Adamson, who released a version on his album Moss Side Story (1988). A vocal version of the theme called "Delilah Jones", with lyrics by Sylvia Fine unrelated to the subject matter of the film, was released by the McGuire Sisters on Coral Records in 1956.

A vocal version of Bernstein's composition "Molly" with lyrics by Fine, entitled "Molly-O", was also recorded by a number of artists, including The Gaylords, Dick Jacobs and his orchestra, and others.

An alternate theme song, "The Man With the Golden Arm", was composed by Sammy Cahn and Jimmy Van Heusen, and recorded by Sinatra backed by Nelson Riddle's orchestra. However, the song was ultimately not used in the film and did not appear on the soundtrack album. Although Sinatra's recording appeared on some bootleg albums, it remained officially unreleased until 2002, when it was included in the box set Frank Sinatra in Hollywood 1940–1964. Sammy Davis Jr. also recorded a version of the Cahn/ Van Heusen theme, which was released on Decca in 1955.

Track listing
All compositions by Elmer Bernstein
 "Clark Street: (a) The Top; (b) Homecoming; (c) Antek's" - 4:58
 "Zosh" - 4:28
 "Frankie Machine" - 4:57
 "The Fix" - 3:30
 "Molly" - 4:53
 "Breakup: (a) Flight; (b) Louie's; (c) Burlesque" - 3:42
 "Sunday Morning" - 2:49
 "Desperation" - 2:47
 "Audition" - 2:42
 "The Cure: (a) Withdraw; (b) Cold; (c) Morning" - 5:57
 "Finale" - 4:13

Personnel
Orchestra conducted by Elmer Bernstein featuring:
Shorty Rogers - flugelhorn 
Conte Candoli, Pete Candoli, Buddy Childers, Bob Fleming, Ray Linn, Cecil Read, Maynard Ferguson, - trumpet
Albert Anderson, Harry Betts, Milt Bernhart, Jimmy Henderson, George Roberts, Frank Rosolino, Ray Sims - trombone
Joe Eger, Arthur Frantz, Dick Perissi- French horn
Martin Ruderman, Sylvia Ruderman - flute
Nick Fera, Mitchell Lurie - clarinet
Jerome Kasper, Bud Shank - alto saxophone
Bob Cooper, Bill Holman, Jack Montrose - tenor saxophone
Jimmy Giuffre - baritone saxophone
Arnold Koblenz - oboe
Fowler Friedlander, Jack Marsh - bassoon 
Sam Rice - tuba
Israel Baker, Anatol Kaminsky - violin
Philip Goldberg, Milton Thomas - viola
Armand Kaproff – cello
Chauncey Haines - novachord
Pete Jolly, Lou Levy, Ray Turner - piano
Abe Luboff, Ralph Peña - bass
Shelly Manne  - drums
Milt Holland, Lee Previn - percussion
Fred Steiner - orchestration

See also
List of American films of 1955

Notes

External links
 
 
 
 
 

1955 drama films
1955 films
American black-and-white films
American drama films
Articles containing video clips
Films about heroin addiction
Films about music and musicians
Films based on American novels
Films directed by Otto Preminger
Films scored by Elmer Bernstein
Films set in Chicago
Films about gambling
United Artists films
United States National Film Registry films
1950s English-language films
1950s American films